Carl Willoch Ludvig Horn (21 August 1841 – 13 August 1913) was a Norwegian educator, textbook writer and politician. He was born in Kristiansand.

He served as principal of the middle school in Hamar, was a member of various governmental commissions, and wrote textbooks in geography. He also served as mayor of Hamar.

References

1841 births
1913 deaths
People from Kristiansand
People from Hamar
Heads of schools in Norway
Norwegian textbook writers
Mayors of places in Hedmark